Wentford Elijah "Mumbo" Gaines (born February 4, 1953) is a former American football defensive back who played in the National Football League for the Pittsburgh Steelers and Chicago Bears.

Early life
Gaines was raised in Anderson, South Carolina. In high school, he was noted more for his basketball and track performances, but when he failed receive any basketball scholarship offers, he decided to turn his attention to football. He attended Ferrum Junior College in Ferrum, Virginia. After two years at Ferrum he attended Tennessee Tech for a year before transferring to the University of Cincinnati where he played football and majored in Health Administration.

Football career
Gaines was drafted in the ninth round of the 1976 NFL Draft by the Pittsburgh Steelers.

The Chicago Bears signed Gaines a month later. He split time at left cornerback for the Bears with Terry Schmidt.

Gaines once again landed on the injury list after suffering a dislocated wrist in the Bears eighth game of 1980. His playing career ended when he was cut by the Bears during training camp in 1981.

Post-football life
Gaines has twin sons, Jerrid and Jerrod. Jerrid played college football at Miami University and attended camps with both the Cleveland Browns and Cincinnati Bengals in 2008. As of 2011 Gaines was coaching football at Lincoln High School in Jersey City, New Jersey.

References

1953 births
Living people
American football defensive backs
Pittsburgh Steelers players
Chicago Bears players
Cincinnati Bearcats football players
People from Anderson, South Carolina
Players of American football from South Carolina